Pass Notes is a regular tongue-in-cheek feature in the UK newspaper The Guardian, first published in the short-lived Sunday Correspondent newspaper in 1989. It has been published in The Guardian since 1992, with a four-year hiatus between 2005 and 2009. On 28 June 2011, the 3,000th Pass Notes was published.

Structure
Pass Notes – usually published four times a week on page 3 of The Guardian – was originally billed as "A daily briefing on contemporary people and events which may be of use to those whose commitments do not permit them to immerse themselves in current affairs as fully as they might wish". It follows a question-and-answer pattern between two unidentified persons, one of whom apparently asks (or answers) often naive questions about the subject, which can be anything from real people (living or dead) to buildings, countries, food or more abstract entities.

Every Pass Notes begins with "Age" and "Appearance", followed by several questions and answers. It usually ends with "Do say" and "Don't say", followed by witty remarks one should (or in the latter case, should not) say to or about that day's subject.

Pass Notes is written by several Guardian staff writers, but the feature is published anonymously.

Origins
Pass Notes was conceived by UK newspaper The Sunday Correspondent, which had a short-lived existence between September 1989 and November 1990. Henry Porter, who edited the Correspondents magazine, needed a short regular feature to fill the back page of the magazine and came up with Pass Notes.

After the Correspondent had folded, Pass Notes was taken up by The Guardian in October 1992 for its new G2 supplement, where it remained for many years.

Hiatus
In 2005, Pass Notes was killed off in a major restyling operation at The Guardian, in which several regular features were dropped. But in 2009 it was resurrected and has been a fixed feature in the newspaper and online ever since.

3,000th edition
On 28 June 2011, the 3,000th Pass Notes was featured (the subject was, appropriately, Pass Notes itself), although The Guardian admitted that it wasn't actually sure it was the 3,000th – writer Stephen Moss said that "The numbering has sometimes gone awry, and it is by no means certain we got it back on track. Passnotesologists at the University of Keele have pointed out that in October 1994 two Pass Notes (Robert De Niro and Elizabeth Maxwell) appeared on successive days with the number 511, and that No. 688 was also repeated".

References

The Guardian